The 2013 Knokke-Heist — Bredene was a one-day women's cycle race held from the Knokke-Heist municipality to municipality of Bredene both of which are located in the provincial region of West Flanders, Belgium on May 4 2013. The race has an UCI rating of 1.2.

References

2013 in Belgian sport
2013 in women's road cycling
Women's road bicycle races
Sport in West Flanders
Bredene
Knokke-Heist